{{Infobox film
| name           = Ved
| image          = Ved film poster.jpg
| caption        = 
| director       = Riteish   Deshmukh
| producer       = Genelia D'Souza
| screenplay     = 
| story          = Shiva Nirvana
| based_on       = Majiliby Shiva Nirvana
| starring       = 
| music          = Score:Saurabh BhaleraoSongs:Ajay-Atul
| cinematography = Bhushankumar Jain
| editing        = Chandan Arora
| studio         = Mumbai Film Company
| distributor    = 
| released       = 
| runtime        = 148 minutes
| country        = India
| language       = Marathi
| budget         = 15 crore(1.8 million)
| gross          = <ref name="gross:bm">{{Cite web|url=https://www.esakal.com/manoranjan/riteish-deshmukh-genelia-deshmukh-ved-movie-complete-50-days-in-theatre-drj96|title=Ved: All Time Blockbuster 'Veds Not Out Half Century.. Still Record Earnings Continue|access-date=17 February 2023|website=Sakal}}</ref>
}}Ved is a 2022 Indian Marathi-language romantic drama film directed by Riteish Deshmukh, in his directorial debut, and produced by Genelia D'Souza. Ashok Saraf and Jiya Shankar play supporting roles. It is a remake of the 2019 Telugu-language romantic drama, Majili.Ved was theatrically released on 30 December 2022, with critics generally appreciating the performances of the cast (especially both Riteish and Genelia's) cinematography, songs, and background score but criticised film’s narration & slow pace screenplay. Incidentally, it is also the highest-grossing Marathi film of Deshmukh's career, surpassing the collections of Lai Bhaari (2014). It is a critical as well as commercial success.

 Plot 
Satya Jadhav lives in Mumbai, with his father, Dinkar Jadhav. He aspires to play for the Indian Cricket Team and wants to initially get selected for the local Railways cricket team. While trying to get money to get into a cricket team, he runs into Nisha, and after some misunderstandings, they become close and fall in love. However, they are later separated by Nisha's parents, whose father is a strict Naval officer and disciplinarian, along with the circumstances that plague them. Nisha, who promises to return to Satya, never comes back. Satya falls into depression, turning to alcohol, and pushing away his dream of becoming a cricketer.

Meanwhile, Shravani, Satya's neighbour, had been in love with Satya, since their childhood, of which he is unaware of. When she learnt of Satya's love for Nisha, she started distancing herself from him, but marries him a few years later, after sensing his and Dinkar's pain. However, Satya married Shravani due to pressure from his father, not out of love. He does not work and instead, relives his memories of Nisha. He relies on Shravani's salary, for money to buy alcohol, from the Indian Railways.

When Satya goes to Delhi to help select some cricket players from a youth team, he encounters Khushi, Nisha's daughter. He learns from Nisha's father, that Nisha and her husband, Kunal, died in an accident. Heartbroken, Satya agrees to take Khushi in, as an adopted father, after Nisha's father requests him to, as it was Nisha's wish. He takes Khushi back to Mumbai for cricket training. After letting his family know of the situation, Satya and Shravani both decide to adopt Khushi. However, Khushi says that she will only agree to becoming their adopted daughter, only if, Satya and Shravani sort out their problems and not distance themselves, to which they agree to.

During this time, Satya realises Shravani's love for him and decides to let go of his past for a new start. However, Shravani thinks that he is just acting that way to please Khushi. She decides to get a job transfer to Nagpur, leaving Satya, Khushi, and Dinkar behind. When Satya goes to drop Shravani off at the railway station, he tells her that he loves her and apologizes to her for causing pain. A delighted Shravani decides to stay back. They both embrace and kiss, with Satya finishing his journey towards love.

 Cast 
 Riteish Deshmukh as Satya Jadhav, a former cricketer
 Genelia Deshmukh as Shravani Jadhav, Satya’s wife
 Jiya Shankar as Nisha Katkar, Satya’s ex-girlfriend
 Ashok Saraf as Dinkar Jadhav; Satya's Father 
 Vidyadhar Joshi as Murli Shinde; Shravani's Father
 Raviraj Kande as Bhaskar Anna 
 Shubhankar Tawde as Jonty
 Khushi Hajare as Khushi; Nisha's daughter & Satya's adopted daughter
 Vineet Sharma as Captain Kumar Katkar; Nisha's father
 Pooja Suresh Wankhade as Railway office colleague
 Sandy as Inspector Sonavane
 Kunal Pawar as Kunal; Bride's brother
 Hrishikesh Joshi as Sandeep Patil; Shravani's boss
 Siddhartha Jadhav as Suresh
 Jitendra Joshi as Ramesh
 Salman Khan in a guest appearance as Bhau in song ved laylay.
 Kishor Gadekar in a guest appearance as Advocate

Production

In December 2021, it was announced that Riteish Deshmukh will make his directorial debut in the film to be produced by Genelia Deshmukh under the banner of Mumbai Film Company. The film also marks her debut in Marathi films. On 2 February 2022, Genelia Deshmukh shared video from the sets of the film.

 Release 
The teaser of Ved was released on 24 November 2022 on YouTube.  It was released in theaters on December 30, 2022.

 Soundtrack 

The film's score is composed by Saurabh Bhalerao and the songs are composed by Ajay-Atul while lyrics written by Ajay - Atul and Guru Thakur.

 Reception  
 Critical reception 
Soham Godbole writing for Loksatta praised the acting of ensemble, cinematography and the music, writing, "The best aspects of the film are the cinematography combined with Ajay Atul's music, [which] takes the film to greater heights." Concluding, Godbole opined, "This movie is sure to be a treat for those who are madly in love and those who love madly." Mihir Bhanage reviewing the film for The Times of India rated it with 3 stars out of 5 and wrote, "Ved is a quintessential romantic drama" that "has been shot aesthetically." Bhanage praised the music, writing "The music by Ajay-Atul is good." Concluding the review Bhanage opined, ".... if you’re an average cinegoer wanting to check out what the buzz around Ved is all about, you might be a tad disappointed." Shubham Kulkarni reviewing the film for Koimoi, rated it with two and a half stars and criticised the predictability of narrative writing, "Ved has good things laced with predictability and that kills the vibe." Kulkarni opined that debutant director has shot the songs well writing, "He [the director] blends the music, story, and performances so well." Kulkarni felt that Riteish Deshmukh "has a director in him but, he is too bud completely yet."

 Box office Ved'' earned  net and  gross on the opening day. The film collected  in 20 days of its release. In its fifth week, the film grossed  net and  gross. The film has collected  in India and  worldwide in its fifty-day run.

 the film earned  worldwide.

References

External links

2022 films
Films set in Maharashtra
Marathi remakes of Telugu films
2020s Marathi-language films
2022 romantic drama films
Indian romantic drama films
2022 directorial debut films